First is a mountain location and minor summit on the slopes of the Schwarzhorn in the Bernese Oberland. It is mostly known as a cable car station above Grindelwald (Firstbahn) and as a popular hiking area with the Bachalpsee in proximity. It is also the destination of the classic hike: Schynige Platte-Faulhorn-First.

References

External links
 Cable car website
 First on Hikr

Mountains of the Alps
Mountains of Switzerland
Cable cars in Switzerland
Grindelwald
Mountains of the canton of Bern
Two-thousanders of Switzerland